Crato, Count of Nassau-Saarbrücken (7 April 1621 – 25 July 1642, Straelen), was the oldest son of Count William Louis of Nassau-Saarbrücken and his wife, Landgravine Anna Amalia of Baden-Durlach. He succeeded his father as Count of Nassau-Saarbrücken in 1640. As he was still a minor at the time, he stood under the regency of his mother.

Crato was killed in battle at Straelen in 1642 and was succeeded by his younger brother John Louis.

Counts of Nassau
House of Nassau
1621 births
1642 deaths
17th-century German people